Juinio is a surname. Notable people with the surname include:

 Alfredo Juinio, Filipino civil engineer, educator, and public official
 Poch Juinio (born 1973), Filipino basketball player

See also
 Juninho